Trifluoromethylsulfur pentafluoride, CF3SF5, is a rarely used industrial greenhouse gas. It was first identified in the atmosphere in 2000. Trifluoromethylsulfur pentafluoride is considered to be one of the several "super-greenhouse gases".

Properties 
The chemistry of this compound is similar to that of sulfur hexafluoride (SF6).

As a greenhouse gas 
On a per molecule basis, it is considered to be the most potent greenhouse gas present in Earth's atmosphere, having a global warming potential of about 18,000 times that of carbon dioxide. The chemical is predicted to have a lifetime of 800 years in the atmosphere. However, the current concentration of trifluoromethylsulfur pentafluoride remains at a level that is unlikely to measurably contribute to global warming. The presence of the gas in the atmosphere is attributed to anthropogenic sources, possibly a by-product of the manufacture of fluorochemicals, originating from reactions of SF6 with fluoropolymers used in electronic devices and in microchips, or the formation can be associated with high voltage equipment created from SF6 (a breakdown product of high voltage equipment) reacting with CF3 to form the CF3SF5 molecule.

References

Greenhouse gases
Trifluoromethyl compounds
Sulfur fluorides
Hypervalent molecules